Towneley Park  is owned and managed by Burnley Borough Council and is the largest and most popular park in Burnley, Lancashire, England. At the southern end of the park is Towneley Hall, Burnley's art gallery and museum. To the north are golf courses and playing fields and to the south 24 acres of broadleaf woodland. On the southern boundary is a working farm called Towneley Farm with pastures and plantations extending eastwards into Cliviger.

History
The hall was the home of the Towneley family from around 1200. The family once owned extensive estates in and around Lancashire and the West Riding of Yorkshire. The hall not only contains the 15th-century Whalley Abbey vestments, but also has its own chapel – with a finely carved altarpiece made in Antwerp around 1525. The family departed in March 1902.

Between 2005 and 2011, the Heritage Lottery Fund granted £2.1 million to help fund a major programme of restoration of the Park.

Collections
The art gallery contains important Victorian and Pre-Raphaelite works by Burne-Jones, Waterhouse, Alma-Tadema and Zoffany. watercolours by Turner and local artist Noel H. Leaver, a collection of Lancashire furniture, The Whalley Abbey vestments, natural history, local social and military history, the Towneley Family. The Deer Pond in Towneley Park is a Local Nature Reserve.

Traditions 
According to folklore, the hall was said to have been haunted by a boggart. This spirit appeared once every seven years, just prior to the death of one of the residents. The boggart was linked to 'Sir John Towneley', who in life supposedly oppressed the poor of the district. According to writer Daniel Codd, there are later stories of a strange ghostly white apparition that appears by the River Calder.

Gallery

See also
 Grade I listed buildings in Lancashire
 Listed buildings in Burnley
 Richard Towneley
 Charles Townley

References

External links

 https://towneley.org.uk
Towneley Park - official site at Burnley
Towneley Park Management Plan
Friends of Towneley Park (Registered Charity Number: 1144988)

Fiona Bruce's Britain - Towneley Hall (The Telegraph)

Parks and commons in Burnley
Museums in Lancashire
Country houses in Lancashire
Art museums and galleries in Lancashire
Historic house museums in Lancashire
Grade I listed buildings in Lancashire
Grade II listed parks and gardens in Lancashire
Buildings and structures in Burnley
Local Nature Reserves in Lancashire
History of Burnley Borough